Heike Wilms-Kegel (born October 19, 1952 in Bremen) served in the Bundestag for the German Green Party from 1987 to 1990.  
She represented Rhineland-Palatinate.  In 1996, she was a physician and was hired as the administrator for the Heilbäderverband, a lobby organization for spas and rehabilitation clinics, based in Bonn.

References

1952 births
Living people
Politicians from Bremen
Members of the Bundestag for Rhineland-Palatinate
20th-century German women politicians
Members of the Bundestag for Alliance 90/The Greens